Ignace Municipal Airport  is located  northwest of Ignace, Ontario, Canada. It is one of the few airports in Canada with an IATA code not beginning with "Y".

See also
Ignace Water Aerodrome

References

Registered aerodromes in Kenora District